Superfunk may refer to:
Superfunk (band), French electronica and dance group founded in 1998
Superfunk (album), 1973 studio album by American band Funk, Inc